Aura Zambrano is a Venezuelan beauty pageant titleholder who ended up as 1st runner-up at Miss Venezuela 2001 and was appointed as the official representative of Venezuela to the Miss International 2001 pageant held in Tokyo, Japan, on October 5, 2001, when she also ended up as 1st runner up. Zambrano also competed in the 2002 Miss Intercontinental beauty pageant, held in Fürth, Germany, on June 8, 2002, when she ended up as 4th runner up.

Zambrano competed in the national beauty pageant Miss Venezuela 2001 and obtained the title of Miss Venezuela International. She represented Táchira state.

References

External links
Miss Venezuela Official Website
Miss International Official Website

1981 births
Living people
People from San Cristóbal, Táchira
Miss Venezuela International winners
Miss International 2001 delegates